Darko Talić (born 23 February 1998) is a Bosnian professional basketball player for Igokea of the Bosnian League and the Adriatic League.

Club career
In July 2015, Talić joined the training camp of the Bosnian team Igokea in order to make the final roster. He eventually made the roster and debuted for the team on October 2, in a 67–56 loss to Cedevita Zagreb, Round 1 game of the ABA League. In the summer of 2017 he was sent on a loan to Kakanj in order to get more experience.

References

External links
 Darko Talić at aba-liga.com
 Darko Talić at eurobasket.com
 Darko Talić at fibaeurope.com

1998 births
ABA League players
Bosnia and Herzegovina men's basketball players
KK Igokea players
KK Kakanj players
Living people
Point guards
Serbs of Bosnia and Herzegovina